Monumentum pro Gesualdo is a ballet by the New York City Ballet (NYCB) co-founder and balletmaster George Balanchine to music by Igor Stravinsky composed in honor of the 400th birthday of the composer Carlo Gesualdo and consisting of Stravinsky's orchestrations of Gesualdo's madrigals. The premiere took place on Wednesday, November 16, 1960, at City Center of Music and Drama, New York, with scenery and lighting by David Hays (new lighting by Ronald Bates in 1974) and was conducted by Robert Irving. The composer conducted the score's orchestral premiere on Tuesday, September 27, 1960, for the XXIII Venice Music Festival at La Fenice.

The ballet premiere was part of a special Salute to Italy, which also included the premiere of Variations from Don Sebastian, called the Donizetti Variations since 1961, and performances of Balanchine's La Sonnambula and Lew Christensen's Con Amore. It was first performed in conjunction with Movements for Piano and Orchestra in 1965, and this practice has been followed almost consistently since 1966, with the same leading female dancer in both in most performances. The ballet has three parts, each of just over two minutes duration. The NYCB principal dancer Darci Kistler chose to include Monumentum pro Gesualdo in her farewell performance on Sunday, June 27, 2010.

Casts

Original
 Diana Adams

six women
 Conrad Ludlow

six men
Jacques d'Amboise, for whom the male role was created, was unable to dance the premiere.

References
Playbill, New York City Ballet, Tuesday, April 30, 2008
Repertory Week, New York City Ballet, Winter Season, 2009 repertory, week 4

External links
Monumentum Pro Gesualdo on the Balanchine Trust website

1960 ballet premieres
Ballets by George Balanchine
Ballets to the music of Igor Stravinsky
Ballets designed by David Hays
Ballets designed by Ronald Bates
New York City Ballet repertory
New York City Ballet Salute to Italy